Eureka Manufacturing Company Cotton Mill, also known as Tait Yarn Company and Lincoln Bonded Warehouse Company, is a historic cotton mill located at Lincolnton, Lincoln County, North Carolina.  It was built between 1907 and 1910, and is a two-story, brick factory building with a three-story stair tower.  Adjacent to the factory is a two-story brick office building built between 1902 and 1906. The buildings housed the Eureka Manufacturing Company from 1906 to 1937, and Tait Yarn Company from 1949 to 1966. Lincoln Bonded Warehouse occupied the buildings into the late-1990s. The buildings are owned by the Lincoln County Historical Association.

It was listed on the National Register of Historic Places in 2013.

References

Cotton mills in the United States
Industrial buildings and structures on the National Register of Historic Places in North Carolina
Industrial buildings completed in 1910
Buildings and structures in Lincoln County, North Carolina
National Register of Historic Places in Lincoln County, North Carolina